Nizhnyaya Toyma may refer to:
Nizhnyaya Toyma (rural locality), a village in Kirov Oblast, Russia
Nizhnyaya Toyma (river), a tributary of the Northern Dvina in Russia